Supplications of the Last Gyrosophist is the second studio album by Abu Lahab, independently released on July 12, 2013. The music was notably less hostile than his previous work and showcased a more dance-oriented sound. At forty-four minutes, the album marks his lengthiest musical release to date.

Track listing

Personnel
Adapted from the Supplications of the Last Gyrosophist liner notes.
 Abu Lahab – vocals, instruments, cover art

References

External links 
 Supplications of the Last Gyrosophist at Discogs (list of releases)
 Supplications of the Last Gyrosophist on YouTube

2013 albums
Abu Lahab (musical project) albums